Lucy Margaret Grounds (11 September 1908 – October 1987) was an Australian politician. She was the second woman to sit in the Tasmanian Legislative Council.

She was born in Glenorchy in Tasmania. In 1951 she was elected to the Tasmanian Legislative Council as the Labor Party member for Launceston, following the death of her husband Arthur. She held the seat until she was defeated in 1958. Grounds died in Melbourne in 1987.

Grounds was posthumously inducted to the Tasmanian Honour Roll of Women in 2005 for service to government and to the community.

References

1908 births
1987 deaths
Members of the Tasmanian Legislative Council
Australian Labor Party members of the Parliament of Tasmania
20th-century Australian politicians
Women members of the Tasmanian Legislative Council
20th-century Australian women politicians
Tasmanian politicians